This is the discography for Canadian hip hop artist Classified.

Albums

Studio albums

Compilation albums

Remix albums

EPs

Mixtapes

 The Joint Effort – 2012

Singles

Notes

References 

Discographies of Canadian artists
Hip hop discographies